City of Palaces was a convict ship that transported four convicts from Singapore to Fremantle, Western Australia in 1857. It arrived in Fremantle on 8 August 1857.  The four convicts were all soldiers and sailors who had been convicted by court-martial in India, and sentenced to transportation.  Other than the four convicts, there were no passengers on board.

List of convicts on the City of Palaces

See also
List of convict ship voyages to Western Australia
Convict era of Western Australia

References

Convict ships to Western Australia